Yahyaabad may refer to:

Fars Province
Yahyaabad, Rostam, a village in Rostam County
Yahyaabad, Sepidan, a village in Sepidan County

Isfahan Province
Yahyaabad, Isfahan, a village in Isfahan County
Yahyaabad, Kashan, a village in Kashan County
Yahyaabad, Natanz, a village in Natanz County
Yahyaabad, Shahreza, a village in Shahreza County

Kerman Province
Yahyaabad, Sirjan, a village in Sirjan County
Yahyaabad, Pariz, a village in Sirjan County

Markazi Province

Qazvin Province
Yahyaabad, Qazvin

Razavi Khorasan Province
Yahyaabad, Bardaskan, Razavi Khorasan Province
Yahyaabad, Fariman, Razavi Khorasan Province
Yahyaabad, Jowayin, Razavi Khorasan Province
Yahyaabad, Khoshab, Razavi Khorasan Province
Yahyaabad, Sabzevar, Razavi Khorasan Province
Yahyaabad, Torbat-e Heydarieh, Razavi Khorasan Province
Yahyaabad, Fazl, Nishapur County, Razavi Khorasan Province

Yazd Province

Zanjan Province
Yahyaabad, Zanjan, a village in Zanjan County